The 2020–21 Luxembourg Cup was the 96th year of the football knockout tournament in Luxembourg. The cup began on 2 September 2020. If the cup had been completed, the winner of the cup would have earned a place in the 2021–22 UEFA Europa Conference League.

The previous season's cup was abandoned due to the COVID-19 pandemic in Luxembourg.

For the second consecutive season, the cup was cancelled due to complications caused by the COVID-19 pandemic in Luxembourg.

Preliminary round
Six preliminary round matches were played on 2 September 2020. The draw for the preliminary and first rounds was held on 14 August 2020.

|}

First round
Thiry-two first round matches were played on 9 September 2020. The draw for the preliminary and first rounds was held on 14 August 2020.

|}

Second round
Thirty-one of thirty-two second round matches were played from 16–18 October 2020 before the competition was cancelled. The draw for the second round was held on 14 September 2020.

|}

Third round
Sixteen third round matches were scheduled to be played on 6 March 2021 before the competition was cancelled.

|}

See also
 2020–21 Luxembourg National Division

References

External links
FLF
uefa.com

Cup
2020-21
Luxembourg
Luxembourg Cup